
Fantastico may refer to:

Film and television
Fantástico, a Brazilian television newsmagazine
Fantastico (variety show), an Italian television show
Miss Kitty Fantastico, a pet kitten in the television series Buffy the Vampire Slayer

Music
Fantasticos, Dutch schlager musical duo

Sports
Brian Wohl, also known as WWF wrestler Julio Fantastico
Robert Anthony, an independent wrestler also known as Egotistico Fantastico

Others
Fantastico (supermarket chain), a Bulgarian supermarket chain
Fantastico, the nemesis of superhero Terrifica
Fantastico (web hosting), an application installer script library